is a private junior college in Gifu, Gifu, Japan, established in 2007. The predecessor of the school was founded in 1978.

External links
 Official website 

Japanese junior colleges
Educational institutions established in 1978
Private universities and colleges in Japan
Universities and colleges in Gifu Prefecture
1978 establishments in Japan